Friedrich Georg Tilly was the President of Warsaw.

Mayors of Warsaw
Year of birth missing
Year of death missing